The Neath Abbey television relay station is sited on a hill north of the town of Neath. It was originally built in the 1980s as a fill-in relay for UHF analogue television serving the parts of the town of Neath  to its east with its vertically polarised signal, and the parts of the town to its northwest with its horizontally polarised signal. This is an unusual layout, chosen to avoid signal degradation from reflections off the cliffs to the north. The site consists of a 12 m self-supporting lattice mast standing on land which is itself about 80 m above sea level. The Neath Abbey transmission station is owned and operated by Arqiva.

Neath Abbey transmitter re-radiates the signal received off-air from Kilvey Hill about 10 km to the southwest. When it came, the digital switchover process for Neath Abbey duplicated the timing at the parent station, with the first stage taking place on Wednesday 12 August 2009 and the second stage was completed on Wednesday 9 September 2009, with the Kilvey Hill transmitter-group becoming the first in Wales to complete digital switchover. After the switchover process, analogue channels had ceased broadcasting permanently and the Freeview digital TV services were radiated at an ERP of 10 W each.

Channels listed by frequency

Analogue television

1980s - 12 August 2009
Neath Abbey (being in Wales) transmitted the S4C variant of Channel 4.

Analogue and digital television

12 August 2009 - 9 September 2009
The UK's digital switchover commenced at Kilvey Hill (and therefore at Neath Abbey and all its other relays) on 12 August 2009. Analogue BBC Two Wales on channel 48 was first to close. According to Digital UK ITV1 Wales would take over the vacated BBC Two slot at all relays of Kilvey Hill until the switchover was complete.

On this site this was arguably not strictly necessary as ITV1 Wales' channel was not to be the eventual allocation for the new digital BBC A multiplex. However it is likely that BBC A did temporarily occupy channel 42 for those three weeks, using 64-QAM and running at full power (i.e. 10 W). BBC A could not immediately occupy channel 52 because that frequency was still being used for analogue S4C at Cilfrew, just along the valley.

Digital television

9 September 2009 - present
The remaining analogue TV services were closed down and the new digital multiplexes took over on two of the original analogue channels' frequencies. Channel 52 was occupied for the first time on this site by the existing digital BBC A mux which was moved from its temporary parking channel. Neath Abbey became a proper "group C/D aerial" site for the first time in its history.

References

External links
The Transmission Gallery: Neath Abbey

Transmitter sites in Wales
Wenvoe UHF 625-line Transmitter Group